The 1978 World Modern Pentathlon Championships were held in Jönköping, Sweden.

Medal summary

Men's events

Women's events

Medal table

See also
 World Modern Pentathlon Championship

References

 Sport123

Modern pentathlon in Sweden
World Modern Pentathlon Championships, 1978
World Modern Pentathlon Championships, 1978
Sports competitions in Jönköping
International sports competitions hosted by Sweden